Andreas Chasikos (born June 7, 1984) is a Cypriot sport shooter. He along with Georgios Achilleos won the gold medal in pairs skeet shooting at the 2010 Commonwealth Games.

References

Cypriot male sport shooters
Shooters at the 2015 European Games
Shooters at the 2010 Commonwealth Games
Shooters at the 2014 Commonwealth Games
European Games competitors for Cyprus
1984 births
Living people
Place of birth missing (living people)
Shooters at the 2016 Summer Olympics
Olympic shooters of Cyprus
Commonwealth Games medallists in shooting
Commonwealth Games gold medallists for Cyprus
Commonwealth Games bronze medallists for Cyprus
Universiade medalists in shooting
Universiade medalists for Cyprus
Medalists at the 2011 Summer Universiade
21st-century Cypriot people
Medallists at the 2010 Commonwealth Games